Panjan Kissana (sometimes spelt Panjan kasana)(پنجن کسانہ) is a town and union council of Gujrat District , in the Punjab province of Pakistan. It is part of Kharian Tehsil and is located at 32°46'0N 73°55'0E with an altitude of 262 metres (862 feet).

References

Union councils of Gujrat District
Populated places in Gujrat District